Dovber Schneuri (13 November 1773 – 16 November 1827 OS)  was the second Rebbe (spiritual leader) of the Chabad Lubavitch Chasidic movement. Rabbi Dovber was the first Chabad rebbe to live in the town of Lyubavichi (in present-day Russia), the town for which this Hasidic dynasty is named.  He is also known as the Mitteler Rebbe ("Middle Rebbe" in Yiddish), being the second of the first three generations of Chabad leaders.

Biography

Rabbi Schneuri was born in Liozna, modern day Belarus, on 9 Kislev 5534. His father, Rabbi Shneur Zalman of Liadi, was Rebbe of the community there, and of many Chassidim in White Russia and Lithuania, and other parts of Russia. His father named him after his own teacher, Rabbi Dov Ber of Mezeritch, a disciple and successor of the Baal Shem Tov, the founder of the Chassidic movement. The Yiddish first name דוב-בער Dov-Ber literally means "bear-bear", traceable back to the Hebrew word דב dov "bear" and the German word Bär "bear". It is thus an example of a bilingual tautological name.

Schneuri was a prodigious student, and had begun to study Talmud at the age of seven. His father taught him Zohar, and transmitted to him the teachings of the Baal Shem Tov. Schneuri adopted the family name of "Schneuri," after his father, but succeeding generations changed it to "Schneersohn," or "Schneerson."

In 1788 he married Rebbetzin Sheina, the daughter of a local rabbi. In 1790 Rabbi Dovber was appointed the Mashpia (spiritual guide) of the Hasidim who would come to visit his father. At the age of 39, while studying in the city of Kremenchug, his father died.
He then moved to the small border-town of Lubavichi, from which the movement would take its name. His accession was disputed by one of his father's prime students, Rabbi Aharon HaLevi of Strashelye, however the majority of Rabbi Shneur Zalman's followers stayed with Schneuri, and moved to Lubavichi. Thus Chabad had now split into two branches, each taking the name of their location to differentiate themselves from each other.
He established a yeshivah in Lubavitch, which attracted gifted young scholars. His son-in-law, who later became his successor, Rabbi Menachem Mendel of Lubavitch, headed the Yeshivah.

Like his father, Schneuri considered it his sacred task to help the Jews of Russia, whether they were Chassidim or not, not only spiritually but also economically. The position of the Jews under the Czars was never easy, but it became much worse when Czar Alexander I was succeeded by Czar Nicholas I in 1825. The restrictions against the Jews increased in number and severity, and the Jews continued to be confined to the Pale of Settlement. They had no right to live, work or do business outside the Pale, where conditions had become very difficult in the wake of the Franco-Russian war.

Schneuri thus launched a campaign (in 1822, or 1823) to urge Jews to learn trades and skilled factory work. He urged communities to organize trade schools. He also encouraged the study of agriculture, dairy farming, and the like, reminding them that once upon a time, when the Jewish people lived in their own land, they were a people of farmers, fruit growers, and herdsmen. He urged that boys who did not show promise of becoming Torah scholars should, after the age of 13, devote part of their time to the learning of a trade, or work in the fields, to help support the family.

In 1815, with government permission and sponsorship, he set up Jewish agricultural colonies. He took to the road to raise funds for this purpose, and he visited the Jewish farmers and encouraged them in their pioneer work, also seeing that their spiritual needs and the education of the farmers' children should not be neglected.

He was active in the collection and distribution of financial aid from Russia to the Jewish population in the Holy Land. He intended to settle in Hebron himself, believing that this was the "gate of heaven," and prayers to be particularly effective there. He instructed Chabad followers living in the Holy Land to move to the city for this reason.

Like his father, he was informed upon by his enemies, accused of being a danger to the Russian government. He was arrested on charges of having sent 200-300 rubles to the Sultan, and was ordered to appear for a trial in Vitebsk; however, due to the efforts of several non-Jewish friends he was released before the trial. The day of his release, 10 Kislev 5587, is celebrated joyously to this day by Chabad Chassidim.

Death

He died in Nizhyn on November 16 1827, on his Hebrew birthday, 9 Kislev.

Family
He had two sons, Menachem Nahum and Baruch, and seven daughters.  The oldest of his daughters, Rebbetzin Chaya Mushka, was married to her cousin Menachem Mendel Schneersohn, another grandchild of Schneur Zalman of Liadi. Menachem Mendel succeeded his father-in-law/uncle as Rebbe. Another of his daughters was Menucha Rachel Slonim.

Works

Schneuri wrote many works on Chabad philosophy and Kabbalah. His Chassidic works tend to be very long and intricate. It is said that when he finished writing the bottom line on a sheet of paper, the ink of the top line had not yet dried. Nineteen of his works have been published so far, a good many of them during his lifetime.

He wrote a commentary on the Zohar, "Bi'urei HaZohar". Chasidic philosophy is based on Kabbalah, but interprets it in light of Chasidic thought. It seeks to uncover the inner "soul" of Kabbalah, by relating it to the inner consciousness of man. This can then allow Jewish mysticism to be grasped inwardly. The mystical revival and popularisation of Chasidism allowed the Jewish mystical tradition to be expressed outside of the language of Kabbalah, by uniting and spiritualising other dimensions of Judaism. Nonetheless, the more involved Chasidic texts interpret Kabbalistic ideas extensively, and relate them to personal spirituality.

The different schools in Chasidic thought gave alternative articulations of Chasidic mysticism. Schneur Zalman of Liadi, the founder of Chabad, differed with general Chasidism, by seeing the mind as the route to the heart. Many of the historic works of Chasidic thought across the movement comprise collected teachings and explanations of Torah, often delivered orally, and compiled by the disciples. As Chabad sought to express Chasidus in systematic philosophy, its writings are usually more structured than other schools'.

Schneuri expanded on the elucidation of Chabad philosophy, so that his followers could understand and internalise its spirituality. The path of Chabad demanded and valued inner depth and refinement over external emotional fervour. In the devotion of Chabad, the service of prayer became the central time for self-transformation, through the unique Chabad approach of profound intellectual meditation (Hisbonenus) on Chasidic philosophy during prayer. While businessmen could fulfil their weekday prayer obligations in the regular way, in the early generations of Chabad, it was expected that the Sabbath could offer individuals time to extend their prayers in mystical rapture. In Chabad lore, stories are related of legendary Chasidim who would spend hours devoted to personal prayer, through meditation accompanied by Chasidic melody (Niggun). In his "Kuntres HaHispaalus" (Tract on Ecstasy), now translated into English, Schneuri writes a document in Jewish thought. While personal accounts of the mystical life are rare in Judaism, in this work Rabbi Dovber guides the devotee through the many intellectual and emotional levels of Chabad meditation. It differentiates between the external emotional fervor of general Chasidism, with the Chabad ideal of inner ecstasy in prayer. It is related that Rabbi Schneur Zalman's prayers were so ecstatic that he could not contain their outer emotional expression, and without self-awareness, would roll on the floor or end up in a different location. His son Schneuri, meanwhile, would pray for hours in static ecstasy, until all his clothes would be soaked in perspiration.

One of his most famous works, entitled "Sha'ar HaYichud" (The Gate of Unity), now translated to English , describes the creation and entire make-up of the world according to Kabbalah. The work begins with the "Essence of G-d," and traces the creation of the universe down to the physical world itself, using complicated parables to illustrate difficult points.  The book also describes, in its first ten chapters, the proper way to meditate on these Kabbalistic ideas.

List of works

Maamarei Admur Ha'emtza'i - Chassidic discourses on the Torah and festivals - 20 vols.
Bi'urei HaZohar - explanation of the Zohar
Pirush HaMilos - Chassidic explanation of the liturgy
Kuntres HaHispaalus - on meditation and ecstasy in prayer; also known as Kuntres HaHisbonenus
Shaarei Teshuvah - on Teshuvah, repentance
Derech Chaim - continuation of Shaarei Teshuvah
Toras Chaim - Chassidic discourses on the books of Bereshis and Shemos
Ateres Rosh - Chassidic discourses for the Days of Awe
Shaar HaEmunah - explanation of the Mitzvah of faith and the festival of Pesach
Shaar HaYichud - explanation of Seder hishtalshelus
Shaarei Orah - on the festivals of Chanukah and Purim
Imrei Binah - explanation of the Mitzvah of reading the Shema and donning the Tefillin

Citations

Books
 Communicating the Infinite: The Emergence of the Habad School, Naftali Loewenthal, University Of Chicago Press, 1990. Academic survey of the formation of Chabad in its first two generations, describing the divergent spiritual interpretations of DovBer Schneuri and Aharon HaLevi of Strashelye.
 Hasidic Prayer by Louis Jacobs. Littman Library of Jewish Civilization. New edition 1993 (Paperback). Full overview and explanation of forms of prayer across the whole Hasidic movement. Gives detailed explanation of the unique Chabad approach, and its differences from other ways.
 Tract on Ecstasy by Dobh Baer of Lubavitch. Translated into English and introduced by Louis Jacobs. Vallentine Mitchell, London 1963.
 The Schocken Book of Jewish Mystical Testimonies. Compiled and with commentary by Louis Jacobs. Random House. New edition 1998 (Paperback). Puts the "Tract on Ecstasy" into historical context in Judaism.

External links
 A brief biography of Rabbi Dovber, the "Mitteler Rebbe"
 A translation of Sha'ar HaYichud - The Gate of Unity by Rabbi Dovber, the "Mitteler Rebbe"
 A translation of Kuntres HaHispaalus - A Tract on Divine Inspiration by the "Mitteler Rebbe"
 A translation of Derech Chayim - The Gate of Return by Rabbi Dovber, the "Mitteler Rebbe"
 A translation of the introduction to Shaar HaEmunah - The Gate of Faith by the "Mitteler Rebbe"
 Many of the published works of Rabbi Dovber Schneuri - in Hebrew
 Family Tree

1773 births
1827 deaths
19th-century rabbis from the Russian Empire
Belarusian Hasidic rabbis
Russian Hasidic rabbis
Kabbalists
People from Liozna District
Philosophers of Judaism
Rebbes of Lubavitch
Shneur Zalman of Liadi
Hasidic writers